Walther Langer (1899 – 27 October 1955) was a Czech figure skater. He competed in the men's singles event at the 1932 Winter Olympics.

References

1899 births
1955 deaths
Czech male single skaters
Olympic figure skaters of Czechoslovakia
Figure skaters at the 1932 Winter Olympics
Sportspeople from Ostrava